Dalham Farm is an  geological Site of Special Scientific Interest in High Halstow, north of Rochester in  Kent. It is a Geological Conservation Review site.

The farm shows mass movement of rock and soil on a shallow 8% slope of London Clay, which is seen in ridges across the site. It may be the lowest angled slope failure in Britain, and is important in demonstrating slope degradation where there is no coastal erosion.

A public footpath crosses the site.

References

Sites of Special Scientific Interest in Kent
Geological Conservation Review sites